Punjab Police College Sihala is a training institution of the Punjab Police in Sihala, Pakistan. The police college sihala established in 1959 to providing the training to all the police officials of all ranks. Sihala is the oldest and largest training college of police in Pakistan.

Training courses
The college runs eight courses for various ranks of the punjab police.
Probationer Course (Course for ASIs)
Advance Course (Course for Inspectors)
Upper School Course
Intermediate School Course
Lower School Course
ICITAP and ATA Programme Courses
Junior Commandant Course (Course for DSPs)
Traffic Wardens Course

References

External links

Law enforcement in Pakistan
Police academies in Pakistan
Punjab Police (Pakistan)